{{Infobox television
| image                = The Country Mouse and the City Mouse Adventures logo.jpg
| image_alt            =
| caption              = 
| alt_name             = The Mouse Adventures (United Kingdom)
| genre                = AnimationAdventureNeo-noirMystery
| creator              = 
| based_on             = 
| developer            = 
| writer               = Joseph Mallozzi (Season 1 only)Patrick GranleeseCaroline R. MariaBruce RobbPaul Schibli (adaptation)
| director             = 
| creative_director    = 
| presenter            = 
| starring             = 
| judges               = 
| voices               = Terrence ScammellJulie BurroughsRick JonesHolly Gauthier-Frankel
| narrated             = 
| theme_music_composer = 
| opentheme            = 
| endtheme             = 
| composer             = James Gelfand
| country              = FranceCanada
| language             = FrenchEnglish
| num_seasons          = 2
| num_episodes         = 52
| list_episodes        = List of The Country Mouse and the City Mouse Adventures episodes
| executive_producer   = Chris JenkinsJason David RossKate Bosworth
| producer             = Lisa Taylor
| editor               = 
| cinematography       = 
| camera               = 
| runtime              = 24 minutes
| company              = CINAR FilmsFrance AnimationRavensburger Film & TVWIC EntertainmentReader's Digest (Season 1)  Videal (Season 1)  Motion Pictures, S.A. (Season 1)
| distributor          = CINAR
| network              = France:Canal JFrance 3Canada:TVOntario (Season 1)YTVIci Radio-Canada TéléU.S.:HBO
| picture_format       = 
| audio_format         = Dolby Surround
| first_aired          = 
| last_aired           = 
| related              = The Country Mouse and the City Mouse: A Christmas Tale}}The Country Mouse and the City Mouse Adventures is an animated television series co-produced by CINAR Films and France Animation, produced in association with Ravensburger Film & TV, WIC Entertainment, Reader's Digest (Season 1), TVOntario (Season 1), Videal (Season 1) and Motion Pictures, S.A. (Season 1), in co-production with Canal J and France 3.The Country Mouse and the City Mouse Adventures aired in the U.S. on HBO (who also provided development funding for the series) from March 1, 1998 to October 27, 1999. It premiered in France on France 3 on March 27, 1998.

Storyline and basis
The show follows the adventures of two cousin mice, Alexander from the city and Emily from the country, who go on adventures around the world in the late 19th and early 20th century, usually to help their cousins, solve a mystery, or stop the evil rat, No-Tail No-Goodnik.

The two main characters originally appeared in the 1993 television special The Country Mouse and the City Mouse: A Christmas Tale, which was produced by  Michael Sporn Animation for HBO and Random House. Loosely based on the classic Aesop fable, the television special was also adapted into a book in 1994, titled The Country Mouse and the City Mouse: Christmas Is Where the Heart Is. But the characters were modified for the Cinar series.

Main characters
 
 Emily (voiced by Julie Burroughs) is an American female country mouse who is Alexander's cousin. She wears a red dress with a white apron on it and a straw hat with a red ribbon tied in a bow around it.
 Alexander (voiced by Terrence Scammell) is a British-American male city mouse. He wears a blue suit and a matching hat with a red bowtie and is Emily's cousin.
 No-Tail No-Goodnik (voiced by Rick Jones) is a rat thief with a severed tail, the circumstances of which are never revealed, who is the main antagonist. He goes to some countries and often uses fake tails when doing his duty like doing disguises.

Episodes

ProductionThe Country Mouse and the City Mouse Adventures was initially produced as a 26-episode series costing US$9 million. Production partners Germany's Ravensburger; Reader's Digest in the U.S., and Canadian CINAR (now WildBrain), which contributed US$6 million towards the original project's funding.

The show's main characters were first introduced in the 1993 HBO special, The Country Mouse and the City Mouse: A Christmas Tale. It was loosely based on the classic fable by Aesop.

Telecast and home mediaThe Country Mouse and the City Mouse Adventures aired in the U.S. from March 1, 1998 to October 27, 1999 on HBO (who also provided development funding for the series). Until December 31, 2004, HBO's sister network HBO Family aired repeats of the show. The series premiered in France on France 3 on March 27, 1998 and later on Canal J.

In Canada, it first aired on TVOntario in autumn 1997 and also aired on YTV in 1999. Repeats of the show aired on the Cookie Jar Toons block on This TV until September 23, 2011 and mornings in Ireland on RTÉ Two's The Den, normally at 7:15am. However, all CINAR references in these broadcasts have been replaced by Cookie Jar references, but when Netflix began to stream seasons 1 and 2 on its "watch instantly" streaming service on February 29, 2012, all CINAR references have been restored. It formerly aired on Light TV (now as TheGrio) from December 22, 2016 until October 2, 2020.

Reader's Digest released the first season only on VHS and DVD in the U.S., the United Kingdom, Ireland, France, Germany, Finland and Australia. Direct Source released every four episodes in two DVD volumes from the second season of the show on February 27, 2007. Season 1 is also available on iTunes.

Mill Creek Entertainment released The Country Mouse and the City Mouse Adventures - 26 Mice Tales Around The World'' on August 4, 2015 on DVD for Region 1. This 2-disc collection features all 26 episodes from the second season on DVD for the very first time. As of 2022, the show is available on Tubi.

References

External links
 
 Summary at EpGuides

1990s French animated television series
1998 French television series debuts
1999 French television series endings
1990s Canadian animated television series
1998 Canadian television series debuts
1999 Canadian television series endings
Animated television series about children
Animated television series about mice and rats
Canadian children's animated adventure television series
Canadian television shows based on children's books
French children's animated adventure television series
French television shows based on children's books
English-language television shows
YTV (Canadian TV channel) original programming
HBO original programming
Reader's Digest
Television series about cousins
Television series by Cookie Jar Entertainment
Works based on Aesop's Fables
Television shows set in Africa
Television shows set in Asia
Television shows set in Europe
Television shows set in South America
Television shows set in Oceania
Television shows set in North America